Ansary is the surname of the following people

Abdulrahman al-Ansary (born 1935), Saudi Arabian archaeology professor
Cyrus A. Ansary (born 1934), American lawyer and philanthropist
Hushang Ansary (born 1926), Iranian-American diplomat
Nina Ansary (born 1966), Iranian-American historian and author
Tamim Ansary (born 1948), Afghan-American author
Waleed El-Ansary, Egyptian-American economist